The Audie Award for Humor is one of the Audie Awards presented annually by the Audio Publishers Association (APA). It awards excellence in narration, production, and content for a humor audiobook released in a given year. It has been awarded since 1997.

Winners and finalists

1990s

2000s

2010s

2020s

References

External links 

 Audie Award winners
 Audie Awards official website

Humor